George W. Bush, the 43rd President of the United States, has run successfully for president twice:

* George W. Bush 2000 presidential campaign
 George W. Bush 2004 presidential campaign